The 1908 NSWRFL season was the inaugural season of the New South Wales Rugby Football League's premiership, Australia's first rugby league football club competition, in which nine clubs (eight from Sydney and one from Newcastle) competed from April till August 1908. The season culminated in the first premiership final, for the Royal Agricultural Society Challenge Shield, which was contested by Eastern Suburbs and South Sydney. In 1908 the NSWRFL also assembled a New South Wales representative team for the first ever interstate series against Queensland, and towards the end of the season, the NSWRFL's leading players were absent, having been selected to go on the first Kangaroo tour of Great Britain.

Background

Early in the 20th century in Sydney, the game of rugby football was contested in competitions that were affiliated with the Rugby Football Union based in England. In 1895 the breakaway Northern Rugby Football Union was formed and its own version of rugby football started to evolve. The reasons for this split were ultimately based around the fact that clubs had wanted to compensate their players for time away from work due to injuries and travelling. After the Rugby Football Union denied the clubs' requests for compensation, many northern English clubs broke away and formed a new league, which implemented gradual rule changes to the football it played in an attempt to make a more attractive game for crowds. When crowd numbers started to rise, clubs were able to afford to pay players benefits as a direct result of increased gate takings.

In 1906 in Sydney, crowd numbers for football matches began to increase significantly following the emergence of an especially talented player, Dally Messenger, whose skill was considered a pleasure to watch. It was around this time that the discontent of players with their clubs for failing to shift away from the amateur culture of the Rugby Football Union was starting to show. Even though bigger crowds had brought increased revenue to the game, footballers did not see any of the increased revenue going back to them. On 8 August 1907 a group of leading players and supporters met at Bateman's Hotel, George Street, Sydney and resolved to form the New South Wales Rugby Football League (NSWRFL). In the latter half of 1907, and unknown to the general public, Dally Messenger secretly agreed to sign on to play in a breakaway professional competition that would start the following year, run by the NSWRFL. It would turn out to be Messenger's popularity that would ensure the success of the new competition.

Early in 1908, a number of Rugby Football Union clubs held meetings across Sydney and Newcastle to decide whether or not breakaway clubs should be formed in preparation for the new Rugby Football League's premiership that was to start in the following months. The popularity amongst players in support of the new competition was overwhelming, with only some players deciding to continue playing in the traditional amateur Rugby Football Union competition. The Rugby Football League clubs that were formed were essentially breakaway clubs, and in most instances, teams continued the use of their team colours into the new competition. A key aspect of the new code was that players would be paid for playing the game. Adopting the playing rules of the rebel Northern Union of England, the new competition began on Easter Monday, 20 April 1908.

Touring parties
The 1907–08 All Golds arrived back in Australia on 9 April. They spread themselves around the eight clubs that were preparing for the season and helped advise them on the rules of rugby league. The team watched the first round of the competition before heading to Newcastle and playing the first game of rugby league in that city. They then played matches against New South Wales and Australia before heading north to Queensland. The final test was held on 6 June and Australia defeated New Zealand 14–9 for their first test win.

A New Zealand Māori side had arrived in Sydney in the first week of June and watched the All Golds' final test. They played four matches in New South Wales before also heading north to Queensland. On their return they played three more matches, including one against Australia, before financial and legal disputes ended the tour.

Teams
Eight teams contested the first round of the season; seven teams from Sydney and one team from Newcastle. Another Sydney team, Cumberland, joined the competition in the second round, making it nine teams in total, however the club exited the League at the end of the season.

Season summary
All four games of the premiership's opening round were played on 20 April 1908. Two games were held at Wentworth Park and the other two at Birchgrove Oval. In total, 3000 people attended at each venue for the back-to-back matches, with Glebe, Balmain, South Sydney and Eastern Suburbs winning their respective matches over Newcastle, Western Suburbs, North Sydney and Newtown. In all, ten regular-season rounds were played, to be followed by two semi-finals and then a final.

The season was a financial disaster for the New South Wales Rugby Football League. The competition had a distinct lack of star players, was hurt by a number of refereeing problems and suffered from a lack of exposure from the conservative press. Many players who had switched over from rugby union were sacked from their weekday jobs and were no longer allowed to enter the Sydney Cricket Ground, home of the New South Wales Rugby Union. The five captains that had moved from rugby union were also publicly ostracised.

The season's highest crowd came in the second round when South Sydney beat Cumberland in front of 20,000 people. Due to Cumberland having just been admitted into the premiership, this match was played 2 weeks after the other 3 games of round 2 had been completed. South Sydney consequently played their second match of the "round" because of this.

At the end of the season, Eastern Suburbs' Horrie Miller was the competition's top points scorer and top try scorer.

Results

Ladder

Cumberland deducted 2 points due to late entry into the competition.

Ladder progression

Green indicates team finished in top 4.
- indicates the team entered the competition late.

Finals
The competition was decided on which side had the most premiership points at the end of the year. After the regular season had completed, the top four teams played an extra round in order break the deadlock between South Sydney and Eastern Suburbs which both ended up on 18 points. After these two teams won their respective semi-finals, a final was played. South Sydney overcame a depleted Eastern Suburbs side to take away the inaugural premiership.

Final

Both teams were weakened by the absence of players selected to travel to England on the first Kangaroo tour.

The following is a report from The Sydney Morning Herald newspaper on the final between South Sydney and Eastern Suburbs.

"The final match to determine the premiership in the first grade of the Rugby League was played on the Agricultural Society's Ground on Saturday in perfect weather. The match was shorn of much interest on account of prominent members of both teams being absent, on their way to England. In accordance with the League rules, one-third of the profits of the match will be devoted to charity. The game, which was brilliant, and at times rather rough, resulted in a victory for South Sydney by 14 points to 12. The winners deserved their victory.

South Sydney lost the toss, and kicked off from the southern end, an easterly wind blowing across the ground, and the sun shining strongly against them. Play hummed from the beginning. South Sydney having the better of matters, the forwards putting in splendid work. Getting the ball from the scrum repeatedly, South Sydney's backs executed several brilliant bursts, but the tackling of their opponents was very safe. However, they broke through once, Conlin making a beautiful feinting run, and then passing to Senior, on the wing, the latter scoring a pretty try.

Immediately afterwards Herb Brackenrigg kicked a penalty goal for Eastern Suburbs. South Sydney now attacked strongly, and appeared likely to score, but Horrie Miller, intercepting a yard or so from his own line, raced the whole length of the ground and scored a beautiful try behind the posts. Brackenrigg converted, making the scores 7 points to 3 in favour of Eastern Suburbs.

On resuming South Sydney obtained the upper hand, forwards and backs playing brilliantly. They made repeated dashes, but could not break through for a long time. Once Storie got across, but was tackled. Then the three-quarters made fine dashes on either wing. From the last of these, which ended on the line, Golden scored a try, which Green failed to convert. Just before half time, Edward Fry marked at Eastern Suburb's 25, and Conlin kicked a fine goal, South Sydney leading by 8 points to 7.

The second half proved exciting from start to finish, Eastern Suburbs at first attacked and South Sydney got out of the difficulty by forcing. South Sydney now became aggressive, the three-quarters combining very neatly. They repeatedly penetrated the defence, but could not put the finishing touch to the movements for some time. At length Levison obtained a scrum and passed to Conlin, on the wing. The latter dashed for the line, and scored. The kick at goal failed. South Sydney 11 points to 7.

Eastern Suburbs put in fine work. Dan Frawley and Brackenrigg dribbling almost to the line. Then McNamara dropped a field goal from centre, which reduced South Sydney's lead to 2 points. McNamara almost repeated the performance a few minutes later, South Sydney rallied, and Levison getting from a scrum at the 25 passed in to Butler, who scored. The kick at goal failed.

Play now became very rough, several players being knocked out temporarily, and the referee had to administer cautions. Near time, Eastern Suburbs came with a rush, and Miller scored a good try, which Brackenrigg failed to convert.

There was no further scoring, South Sydney winning by 14 points to 12.

Statistics

Points

Tries

Lower Grades
The NSWRFL also conducted Second and Third Grade competitions in this inaugural season. Matches were held on the same day that the First Grade competition commenced, Easter Monday, 20 April.

Second Grade
Eight teams entered the Second Grade competition: Balmain, Eastern Suburbs, Enfield, Glebe, Newtown, North Sydney, South Sydney, Western Suburbs. By the end of May, however, Enfield had withdrawn. Western Suburbs were not listed to play in July or August.

Eastern Suburbs were the dominant team in the grade. Arrangements were made for the team to play two curtain raisers to representative matches, the first against a Combined Third Grade team. After the penultimate round, the Sydney Sportsman reported, "Glebe II. forfeited to Eastern Suburbs II. at the Agricultural Ground. This gives E.E. the [Second Grade] premiership, for they have been unbeaten throughout the season." Their opponents for the final round of matches also forfeited.

Third Grade
Eight teams entered the Third Grade competition: Balmain, Drummoyne, Eastern Suburbs, Glebe, Newtown, North Sydney, South Sydney, Sydney. North Sydney and South Sydney appear to have withdrawn, however, as they are not listed in the fixtures published on Saturdays in the Sydney Morning Herald in July or August.

The Sydney team won the competition. Arrangements were made for the team to play the second grade premiers, Eastern Suburbs II, in a curtain raiser to the first grade final on 30 August. With many of the Eastern Suburbs second graders required to fill in first grade for club-mates in transit to England, this was quickly changed. Sydney, defeated the third grade runner's up, Drummoyne, in the curtain-raiser, by 11 to 3. The Sydney Morning Herald reported that Sydney had "an unbeaten record", however a result from 8 August in the Sunday Times has Eastern Suburbs III defeating Sydney, by 11 to nil.

Notes

References

Bibliography

Further reading
 Rugby League Tables – Notes The World of Rugby League
 Rugby League Tables – Season 1908 The World of Rugby League
 Premiership History and Statistics RL1908 (archived)
 South Sydney Claim Rugby League Title RL1908 (archived)
 New South Wales Competitions 1908 The Vault
 History – Introduction North Sydney Bears

External links
The Game Begins – nma.gov.au 
Results: 1908–1910 at rabbitohs.com.au
1908 Royal Agricultural Society of NSW Challenge Shield at rleague.com

New South Wales Rugby League premiership
NSWRFL season